Pimolisa, or Pimolison, was a fortified town of ancient Paphlagonia on the Halys River, near the western border of Pontus. It had been destroyed by Strabo's time, but the district on both sides of the Halys was still called Pimolisene.

Its site is located near Osmancık, Asiatic Turkey.

References

Populated places in ancient Paphlagonia
Former populated places in Turkey
Roman towns and cities in Turkey
Populated places of the Byzantine Empire
History of Çorum Province